Denver and Rio Grande Western No. 168 is a class "T-12"  “Ten Wheeler” type narrow-gauge steam railway locomotive. It is one of twelve similar locomotives built for the Denver and Rio Grande Railroad (D&RG) by the Baldwin Locomotive Works in 1883. It was built as a passenger locomotive, with  drivers, the largest drivers used on any three foot gauge D&RGW locomotive. The large drivers made it suitable for relatively fast passenger service.

Various photographs show 168 during its working life. One shows it in the Black Canyon of the Gunnison River in 1904. Another shows it in Montrose, Colorado, west of Gunnison, at the head of a special train taking President William Howard Taft to the opening of the Gunnison Tunnel which, at the time, was the longest irrigation tunnel in the world. There are also photographs, taken by Otto Perry, showing it in Alamosa in 1923 and Salida in 1929. It was retired in 1938 after a service life of 55 years.

The railroad gave it to the City of Colorado Springs on August 1, 1938. It was added to the National Register of Historic Places as Rio Grande Engine No. 168 in 1979. Although it sat in Antlers Park, unprotected from the elements, behind a low fence, for so many years, it appeared to be in immaculate cosmetic condition when removed for restoration to operating condition in early 2016.

The city has entered into an agreement with the Cumbres and Toltec Scenic Railroad (C&TSRR) to have the engine restored to working order. The locomotive is now located in Antonito, Colorado.

Restoration was completed in October 2019. The restoration project was headed up by Cumbres and Toltec Special Projects department and led by Assistant General Manager Efstathios Papas. The project cost $508,000 and took 27 months to complete. The railroad intends to use this engine frequently and put it into normal service as much as possible.

See also

National Register of Historic Places listings in El Paso County, Colorado
Rio Grande 169
Rio Grande 223
Rio Grande 278
Rio Grande 315
Rio Grande 463

References

Railway vehicles on the National Register of Historic Places in Colorado
Buildings and structures in Colorado Springs, Colorado
Railway locomotives introduced in 1883
Railway locomotives on the National Register of Historic Places
4-6-0 locomotives
Baldwin locomotives
Individual locomotives of the United States
0168
Narrow gauge steam locomotives of the United States
Tourist attractions in Colorado Springs, Colorado
3 ft gauge locomotives
Preserved steam locomotives of Colorado